The Uhabia or Ouhabia is a coastal river of the French Basque Country, in Aquitaine, southwest France.

Geography 

It rises at Goizbide in the woods above Ustaritz and Saint-Pée-sur-Nivelle, where it is known as the Apalagako erreka. 
It collects waters from the Alhorgako Erreka and drains the plain of Belhardi in the north of Ahetze, before flowing into the Bay of Biscay in Bidart.

Name 
Its name Uhabia is the regular evolution of ur habia, that can be translated as "course of the water".

Main tributaries 

 Barrandiko Erreka, from Othe Xuria
 Alhorgako Erreka, from Zirikolatz

Départements and towns 

 Pyrénées-Atlantiques: Ustaritz, Arbonne, Bidart.

References

Rivers of France
0Uhabia
Rivers of Pyrénées-Atlantiques
Rivers of Nouvelle-Aquitaine